The Ref (Hostile Hostages in some countries) is a 1994 American black comedy film directed by Ted Demme, starring Denis Leary, Judy Davis, Kevin Spacey and Glynis Johns.

Plot
On Christmas Eve in an affluent Connecticut hamlet, Lloyd and Caroline Chasseur are in a marriage counseling session. Caroline has had an affair, and Lloyd is miserable and blames the behavioral problems of their 15-year-old son Jesse on his wife's coddling of him. Caroline calls out Lloyd for his inability to stand up to his domineering mother, Rose. 

In the same town, cat burglar Gus is in the midst of stealing jewelry from a home he has broken into. However, his plan goes awry when he accidentally sets off the alarm and is chased out by a guard dog. His getaway car, driven by his bumbling partner Murray, is no longer there. At a convenience store, he runs into Lloyd and Caroline and decides to take them hostage, ordering the couple to drive him to their house. Along the way, Caroline and Lloyd continue to argue, with Gus having to repeatedly intercede and telling them to shut up.

At the Chasseur house, Gus has Lloyd and Caroline tied up as he figures out a way to flee town with Murray. Lloyd and Caroline continue to bicker. Knowing that Murray usually seeks refuge at seedy bars, Gus calls the local bar and manages to get in touch with him. He instructs Murray to steal a boat for their getaway. The local police set up roadblocks and impose a curfew to look for Gus, while two inept officers go door-to-door. Lt. Huff, the police chief, is less than concerned because the town rarely sees criminal activity like this. 

Jesse, who has been away at a military school, arrives home earlier than his parents expect. Unbeknownst to his parents, Jesse has been blackmailing the school's commanding officer, Siskel, with photographs of an affair, and is stashing the money with plans of running away. Gus has Jesse tied up along with his parents. Jesse, unhappy with his home life, pleads to join Gus into a life of crime, but Gus calls Jesse out on his naivety and tells the boy he should appreciate his comfortable upbringing.

As the police search for Gus expands, he is forced to continue hiding out in the Chasseur home while he waits on Murray. Complicating matters are visiting neighbors, such as George, who is dressed up as Santa Claus and arrives to deliver a fruitcake for the family. Later, Lloyd's family—his brother Gary, sister-in-law Connie, their two children Mary and John, and mother Rose—arrive to celebrate Christmas Eve. Rose is extremely wealthy and bullies everyone in the family. To hide any suspicion that Lloyd and Caroline are being held hostage, Gus pretends to be the couple's marriage counselor, Dr. Wong, and tells Lloyd's family his presence is needed as part of "experimental therapy". Jesse is tied up and gagged upstairs in his parents' closet. During the family dinner, Caroline and Lloyd are unable to stop fighting, and Caroline demands a divorce. Gus' pointed comments goad Lloyd to stand up to his wife and his mother. Everyone finds out who Gus really is after Rose attempts to go upstairs; Gus puts a gun to her head, and Connie, fed up with her mother-in-law, says, "Shoot her."

Siskel turns up at the door and reveals how he is being blackmailed. Jesse has managed to untie himself and his parents discover his hidden money. George, still dressed as Santa, but now very drunk, returns to the home, protesting why he never gets a gift in return. He spots the gun and realizes who Gus is but gets knocked out. The state police arrive, and Lloyd, having a change of heart, decides he cannot "spend [his] life sending everyone [he] care[s] about to prison", and instructs Jesse to take Gus to the docks using a path through the woods. Gus, in George's Santa suit, makes it safely to a boat where Murray awaits. The men escape, arguing in much the same manner he argued all night with Caroline and Lloyd. 

Back at home, the couple's bickering even drives away the police. Having aired out their differences throughout the evening with their armed robber's assistance, they make up and decide to stay together. Their reconciliation is interrupted when John informs them that "grandma Rose is eating through her gag."

Cast

Production
Richard LaGravenese co-wrote the film with his sister-in-law Marie Weiss. It was inspired by their families. For example, the dinner scene: "Both Marie and I are Italian Catholics who married into Jewish families, so we do have those big holiday dinners," LaGravenese said. Weiss began writing the script in 1989 after she and her husband moved from New York to California. Inspiration came from an argument she had with him and she thought, "Wouldn't it be great if there were a third party to step in and referee?" She wrote several drafts and consulted with LaGravenese in 1991 and they took it to Disney. The studio approved the project within 20 minutes. LaGravenese spent a year revising the script until he finally got "tired of doing rewrites for executives."

After Ted Demme directed comedian Denis Leary in No Cure for Cancer, a stand-up comedy special for Showtime, they got the script for The Ref and decided to do it. The studio cast Leary based on the sarcastic funny-man persona he cultivated in MTV spots that Demme directed. Leary joined the project as part of a three-picture deal with Disney. Their involvement motivated LaGravenese to come back to the project. Executive producer Don Simpson described the overall tone of The Ref as "biting and sarcastic. Just my nature."

After test audiences responded poorly to the film's original ending—Gus turned himself in to show Jesse that a life of crime leads nowhere quickly—a new ending was shot in January 1994.

Reception
The Ref did not perform as well at the box office as Leary would have liked, and he blamed the studio's method of marketing it: "They did me like the MTV guy. And they shortchanged what the movie was all about." The film grossed a total of only $11,439,193 at the domestic box office, after coming in at #4 opening weekend, behind Guarding Tess, Lightning Jack and Ace Ventura: Pet Detective. Leary made fun of himself in a humorous article written for a 1994 issue of Playboy where he pretends to interview Pope John Paul II: Leary asks the Pope if he has seen The Ref, and the Pope responds that he was told it was very vulgar, as evident by its unpopularity.

On Rotten Tomatoes the film has a "Certified Fresh" approval rating of 73% based on reviews from 55 critics, with an average rating of 6.5/10. The site's consensus is: "Undeniably uneven and too dark for some, The Ref nonetheless boasts strong turns from Denis Leary, Judy Davis, and Kevin Spacey, as well as a sharply funny script."

Roger Ebert gave it three out of four stars. He wrote, "Material like this is only as good as the acting and writing. The Ref is skillful in both areas." Rolling Stone magazine's Peter Travers praised the performances of Kevin Spacey and Judy Davis: "They are combustibly funny, finding nuance even in nonsense. The script is crass; the actors never." In her review for The New York Times, Caryn James praised Leary's performance: "For the first time he displays his appeal and potential as an actor instead of a comic with a sneering persona." Glenn Kenny of Entertainment Weekly gave it a grade A−.

Entertainment Weekly gave the film a "C−" rating, and Owen Gleiberman wrote, "The Ref is crushingly blunt-witted and monotonous in its celebration of domestic sadism." In his review for The Washington Post, Hal Hinson criticized Leary's performance: "A stand-up comic trying to translate his impatient, hipster editorializing to the big screen, he doesn't have the modulation of a trained actor, only one speed (fast) and one mode of attack (loud)."

The film was among 500 nominated for AFI's 100 Years...100 Laughs list.

Year-end lists 
 Top 10 (not ranked) – Betsy Pickle, Knoxville News-Sentinel
 Best "sleepers" (not ranked) – Dennis King, Tulsa World
 "The second 10" (not ranked) – Sean P. Means, The Salt Lake Tribune
 Dishonorable mention – William Arnold, Seattle Post-Intelligencer
 Dishonorable mention – Dan Craft, The Pantagraph

See also
 List of Christmas films

References

External links

The Ref - Film Transcript

1990s black comedy films
1990s Christmas films
1990s crime comedy films
1994 comedy films
1994 films
American black comedy films
American Christmas films
American crime comedy films
1990s English-language films
Films about dysfunctional families
Films about kidnapping
Films directed by Ted Demme
Films set in Connecticut
Films shot in Ontario
Touchstone Pictures films
1990s American films